Coal Creek is a tributary of the Elk River.  Their confluence is in the city of Fernie, British Columbia.  Coal Creek passes through its namesake, Coal Creek, British Columbia, today a ghost town.

See also
Coal Creek (disambiguation)

References

Elk Valley (British Columbia)
Rivers of the Canadian Rockies
Rivers of British Columbia